Domkal Assembly constituency is an assembly constituency in Murshidabad district in the Indian state of West Bengal.

Overview
As per orders of the Delimitation Commission, No. 75 Domkal Assembly constituency covers Ajimganjgola, Bhagirathpur, Domkal, Garaimari, Garibpur, Ghoramara, Jitpur, Juginda, Juranpur, Madhurkul, Raipur and Sarangpur gram panchayats of Domkal community development block.

Domkal Assembly constituency is part of No. 11 Murshidabad (Lok Sabha constituency).

Members of Legislative Assembly

Election results

2021

In the 2021 election, Jafikul Islam of AITC defeated his nearest rival Md. Mostafijur Rahaman of CPI (M).

2016 
In the 2016 election, Anisur Rahman of CPI(M) defeated his nearest rival Soumik Hossain of Trinamool Congress.

Note- In this Domkal Assembly constituency, seat sharing did not happen between the Left Front and Indian National Congress.

2011 
In the 2011 election, Anisur Rahman of CPI(M) defeated his nearest rival Soumik Hossain of Congress.

1977–2006 
In the 2006, 2001, 1996 and 1991 Anisur Rahman of CPI(M) won the Domkal assembly seat defeating his nearest rival Rejaul Karim of Congress in 2006 and 2001, Sadeque Reza of Congress in 1996 and Sarker Mokter Hossain in 1991. Contests in most years were multi cornered but only winners and runners are being mentioned. Md Abdul Bari of CPI(M) defeated Ekramul Hoque Biswas of Congress in 1987, A.K.M.Hazekul Alam of IUML in 1982 and Ekramul Hoque Biswas of Congress in 1977.

1967–1972 
Ekramul Hoque Biswas of Congress won in 1972. Md. Abdul Bari of CPI(M) won in 1971. Ekramul Hoque Biswas of Congress won in 1969. Md. Abdul Bari of CPI(M) won in 1967. Prior to that the Domkal seat was not there.

References

Assembly constituencies of West Bengal
Politics of Murshidabad district